Kepler-4b, initially known as KOI 7.01, is an extrasolar planet first detected as a transit by the Kepler spacecraft. Its radius and mass are similar to that of Neptune; however, due to its proximity to its host star, it is substantially hotter than any planet in the Solar System. The planet's discovery was announced on January 4, 2010, in Washington, D.C., along with four other planets that were initially detected by the Kepler spacecraft and subsequently confirmed by telescopes at the W.M. Keck Observatory.

Nomenclature and history
Kepler-4b was named because it was the first planet discovered in the orbit of its star, Kepler-4. The star was, in turn, named for the Kepler Mission, a NASA satellite whose purpose is to discover Earth-like planets in a section of the sky between constellations Cygnus and Lyra using the transit method. Using this method, Kepler notes small and steady decreases in a star's brightness that are measured as a planet crosses in front of it. Initially, Kepler-4b was detected as a transit event by the Kepler telescope and considered a Kepler Object of Interest with the designation KOI 7.01.

Subsequent radial velocity measurements by the High Resolution Echelle Spectrometer on the telescopes of W.M. Keck Observatory confirmed the planetary nature of the transit event and established a mass estimate for the planet. The planet's discovery was announced on January 4, 2010, along with four other planets detected by Kepler: Kepler-5b, 6b, 7b and 8b at the 215th meeting of the American Astronomical Society in Washington, D.C.

Host star

Kepler-4 is a star very similar to the sun located about 1610 light-years away from Earth, in the constellation of Draco.

Characteristics
Kepler-4b orbits its host star in 3.213 days at a distance of 0.046 AU. This places it almost 10 times closer to its star than Mercury is to the Sun. Consequently, Kepler-4b is thought to be extremely hot, with an equilibrium temperature greater than 1700 kelvins (2600 °F). (1426°C) The planet is estimated to be 25 times more massive than the Earth with a radius that is 4 times greater than the Earth. This makes it similar to Neptune in terms of size and mass, but with a temperature that is not comparable to any planet in the Solar System (Venus, the hottest planet, is only 735 kelvins). Kepler-4b's eccentricity was assumed to be 0, however an independent reanalysis of the discovery data found a value of 0.25 ± 0.12, and a later reanalysis of the light curve discovered a secondary eclipse with depth 7.47 ± 1.82ppm at a phase of about 0.7.

Other Kepler Planets
 Kepler-5b
 Kepler-6b
 Kepler-7b
 Kepler-8b
 Kepler-9b
 Kepler-9c
 Kepler-9d
 Kepler-10b
 Kepler-10c
 Kepler-10d (Unknown)
 Kepler-11b
 Kepler-11c
 Kepler-11d
 Kepler-11e
 Kepler-11f
 Kepler-11g
 Kepler-12b
 Kepler-14b
 Kepler-15b

References

External links

NASA.gov

Exoplanets discovered in 2010
Kepler-04b
Giant planets
Transiting exoplanets
Draco (constellation)
4b